Atomweight (also referred to as light minimumweight, junior strawweight, junior mini-flyweight and pinweight) is a weight class in combat sports.

Boxing
In women's boxing and junior amateur boxing pinweight is, or has been, a weight class for boxers weighing in under  (before 2003, 45 kg).

In September 2010 the women's class in amateur boxing was partly merged into an extended 45–48 kg light flyweight division, with women weighing less than 45 kg excluded from competition. Pinweight is still defined for junior contests.

Women's Professional Champions

Current Champions
(Last updated on May 17, 2022)

Women's Amateur Champions

Mixed Martial Arts

The atomweight division in mixed martial arts generally refers to competitors weighing less than 105 lb.

See also

 Strawweight
 List of current female world boxing champions

References

External links
 Coming into effect September 2010: AIBA, Technical & Competition Rules 2011, Appendix K
 In effect 2002–August 2010: AIBA, Technical & Competition Rules, Rule VIb

Boxing weight classes
Women's boxing